Resolute Eagle is a long-endurance Group 3 unmanned aircraft system (UAS) manufactured and operated by Resolute ISR, Inc. in Carson City, NV.

The Resolute Eagle is a dynamic platform to meet evolving customer requirements. One platform, two configurations. Configuration can be changed in less than 30 minutes. The Standard Fixed Wing configuration launches on a low-pressure Pneumatic launcher and recovers via a Belly-skid landing utilizing a Kevlar skid plate. The Resolute Eagle Hybrid VTOL utilizes two mounted battery-powered booms with four propellers, so it can take off and land like a helicopter—but still, cruise for long distances like a plane. Resolute Eagle utilizes a CloudCap Piccolo Elite + Elevate autopilot to transition from Standard Fixed Wing to VTOL configuration.

Serpent Eagle is a modified Resolute Eagle that is outfitted with multiple EW sensors and is designed to operate in a GPS denied environment.

In August 2020, AATI sold the Resolute Eagle to Resolute ISR, Inc. Resolute Eagle is equipped with a 33 hp multi-fuel engine manufactured by XRDi. XRDi and Resolute ISR are wholly owned by the Heligroup, Inc.

Testing and certification

In November 2017, the Resolute Eagle conducted its first commercial airspace flight at the Pan-Pacific UAS Test Range Complex, at Pendleton Airport, in Oregon. The following November, the VTOL version of the UAS received an interim flight clearance from U.S. Naval Air Systems Command.

Contracts

In June 2017, Resolute Eagle was one of four UAS platforms selected by the U.S. Navy to compete for a position on a potential five-year, $1.73 billion contract to provide intelligence, surveillance and reconnaissance support services.

Resolute ISR/CHI Aviation (Both owned by the Heligroup, Inc.) have been awarded positions on the GSA ASTRO contract vehicle to acquire manned, optionally manned and unmanned platforms and services.

Payloads

Resolute Eagle was designed with Modular Open Systems Architecture (MOSA) principals and is a long-endurance, multi-intelligence platform.
 
Current payloads include the Trillium HD-80 camera, TASE400 family including the TASE400 LD optical and laser designation system. Silvus StreamCaster SC4200-SC4400 MN-MIMO Radio, Bandit 2x, Cubic MMT, and MPU5 mobile ad hoc network (MANET) radios.

The Resolute Eagle successfully demonstrated superior full high throughput over-the-horizon/beyond-line-of-site (BLOS) capability at the White Sands Missile Test Range in January 2017. During the demonstration, the Resolute Eagle proved its ability to provide BLOS operations with high definition full motion video and other sensor data by achieving data rates from the UAS to a fixed base satellite dish located at Lino Lakes, Minnesota of 11 Mbps, and 7.8 Mbps to a small tactical dish on site at White Sands. In addition, the system demonstrated its ability to send command and control data from a tactical GCS back to the UAS for both autonomous commands and manual fight control. The communications capability in this demonstration leveraged High Throughput Satellite Ka band SATCOM. Latency measured during the demonstration was in the order of 550-650ms.

Other hybrid VTOL UAS

 Textron Systems Aerosonde HQ SUAS
 IAI/Hankuk Carbon Panther FE
 Arcturus JUMP-20
 KWT-350 VTOL Fixed-wing UAV

References

Unmanned aerial vehicles of the United States